"In a Mellow Tone", also known as "In a Mellotone", is a 1939 jazz standard composed by Duke Ellington, with lyrics written by Milt Gabler. The song was based on the 1917 standard "Rose Room" by Art Hickman and Harry Williams, which Ellington himself had recorded in 1932. Howard Stern used a recording of this song (from Ellington's Blues in Orbit album) as the opening theme to The Howard Stern Show from 1987 to 1994.

Notable recordings
Red Norvo (1943)
Erroll Garner - Contrasts (1954)
Clark Terry - Duke with a Difference (1957)
Chico Hamilton with Eric Dolphy - The Original Ellington Suite (1958)
Ella Fitzgerald - Ella Fitzgerald Sings the Duke Ellington Songbook (1958)
Ben Webster (with Coleman Hawkins and Roy Eldridge) - Ben Webster and Associates (1959)
Count Basie - Breakfast Dance and Barbecue (1959)
Lambert, Hendricks, & Ross - The Hottest New Group in Jazz (1960)
Billy May - Cha Cha! Billy May (1960)
Coleman Hawkins with Eddie Lockjaw Davis - Night Hawk (1960)
Louis Armstrong and Duke Ellington - The Great Summit (1961)
Harry James - 1964 Live! In The Holiday Ballroom Chicago (Jazz Hour Compact Classics JH-1001, 1989)
Oscar Peterson - Mellow Mood (1968)
Paul Gonsalves - Humming Bird (1970)
Buddy Rich - "Very Alive at Ronnie Scotts" (1971)
Joe Pass - Portraits of Duke Ellington (1975)
Sonny Stitt - Sonny Stitt with Strings: A Tribute to Duke Ellington (1977)
The Manhattan Transfer - Pastiche (1978)
Nick Brignola - L.A. Bound (1979)
Art Pepper and George Cables - Goin’ Home (1982)
Maynard Ferguson - "Live from London" (1994)
Marcus Roberts - Plays Ellington (1995)
Bob Wilber and Dick Hyman - A Perfect Match (1997)
Tony Bennett - Bennett Sings Ellington: Hot & Cool (1999)
Clare Teal - Don't Talk (2004)
Royce Campbell - A Tribute to Charlie Byrd (2004)
Bill Wurtz - (2011)

Notes

Songs with music by Duke Ellington
Songs with lyrics by Milt Gabler
1930s jazz standards
1939 songs